Ivan Ivanovych Ishchenko (born May 19, 1980 in Mykolaiv) is an amateur Ukrainian freestyle wrestler, who played for the men's super heavyweight category. He won a silver medal for his division at the 2006 European Wrestling Championships in Moscow, Russia, losing out to Russia's Kuramagomed Kuramagomedov. Ishchenko is a member of the wrestling team for Dynamo-Osvita Mykolaïv, and is coached and trained by Ruslan Savlokhov.

Ishchenko represented Ukraine at the 2008 Summer Olympics in Beijing, where he competed for the men's 120 kg class. He received a bye for the preliminary round of sixteen match, before losing out to Turkey's Aydın Polatçı, with a three-set technical score (3–0, 0–1, 0–1), and a classification point score of 1–3.

References

External links
Profile – International Wrestling Database
NBC Olympics Profile

1980 births
Living people
Olympic wrestlers of Ukraine
Wrestlers at the 2008 Summer Olympics
Sportspeople from Mykolaiv
Ukrainian male sport wrestlers